Fatu Akelei Feu'u  (born 1946) is a noted Samoan painter from the village of Poutasi in the district of Falealili in Samoa. He has established a reputation as the elder statesman of Pacific art in New Zealand.

Biography 
Feu'u emigrated to New Zealand in 1966 after growing up in the village of Poutasi, Western Samoa. He always wanted to be an artist and noted the difference of how art was viewed between Samoa and New Zealand, with 'beautifully made, functional canoes and houses' being art in Samoa and in New Zealand art was 'something extra special not to be touched'.

Feu'u has been an exhibiting artist since the early 1980s and became a full-time artist in 1988, prior to that he worked as a designer and colour advisor for textile and car companies. He was influenced and mentored by artists Tony Fomison, Pat Hanly and Philip Clairmont.

In 1995 he became the first artist of Pacific heritage awarded the James Wallace Art Award. He was appointed an Honorary Officer of the New Zealand Order of Merit in the 2001 New Year Honours. In 2022 he received the Senior Pacific Artist Award at the Creative New Zealand Arts Pasifika Awards. Feu'u is 'pivotal in shaping the interest in contemporary Pacific art globally and nurturing a generation of Pacific artists locally'. Artist Dagmar Dyck recalls the influence he made on her in as he invited her into a Pasfika artist community near the end of her studies in 1993 at Elam art school in Auckland.This act of recruitment, mentorship and collectivism was typical of the early beginnings of Fatu’s vision for contemporary Pacific arts. (Dagmar Dyck)

Creative work

Exhibitions 
Feu'u has exhibited in numerous exhibitions in New Zealand and internationally with works in national and private collections worldwide. He has exhibited in solo and major group exhibitions including Samoa Contemporary (2008) at Pataka Art + Museum in Porirua.

Feu'u's work was included in two groundbreaking exhibitions of contemporary Pacific art: Te Moemoea no Iotefa, curated by Rangihiroa Panaho for the Sarjeant Art Gallery in 1990 and Bottled Ocean curated by Jim Viviaeare, which toured New Zealand in 1994–1995.

Feu'u was part of the major group exhibition Le Folauga: the past coming forward – Contemporary Pacific Art from Aotearoa New Zealand, at the Auckland Museum. Le Folauga later toured to Taiwan and became the first exhibition of contemporary Pacific art from New Zealand to be shown in a major fine arts museum in Asia. Le Folauga opened at the Kaohsiung Museum of Fine Arts in Taiwan from 13 December 2008 to 5 April 2009.

Collections 
Feu'u's work is included in a number of prestigious national and international collections including the National Gallery, Brisbane; Auckland Art Gallery; Museum of New Zealand Te Papa Tongarewa, Wellington and Waikato Museum of Art and History, Hamilton. His work is also included in an extensive number of private collections in New Zealand, Australia, United States of America, England, Holland, American Samoa, Samoa and Japan.

Public artworks 
Two large wood and paint sculptures are found in Auckland. Ole Alia outside the Massey Library and Leisure Centre  and Unititled  marks the entrance to the South Auckland suburb of Ōtara.

Artistic mediums 
While primarily a painter, Feu'u explores a range of other mediums including bronze, wood and stone sculpture, pottery design, lithographs, woodcuts and glass works (both stained and etched).

Polynesian influences 
Feu'u's work is inspired by Polynesian art forms such as siapo (tapa cloth), tatau (tattoo), weaving, carving and ceremonial mask making.  In these forms he uses a rich lexicon of motifs and compositional structures. His works frequently blend traditional and contemporary elements, incorporating a range of influences, inspirations, techniques and motifs from Samoa and Aotearoa and more generally from Euro-American to Pacific cultures.

Fa'asamoa 
Fa'asamoa is the unifying element of Feu'u's work. The term fa'asamoa is generally defined as 'the Samoan way'. The social structure of Samoan society is held together and actively maintained by an adherence to unwritten but understood cultural conventions embodied in fa'asamoa which binds family networks to traditional customs and ceremonies.

Tautai Pacific Arts Trust 
Tautai Pacific Arts Trust, an organisation of contemporary Pacific artists in New Zealand, was founded in the 1980s as an informal network from an initiative by Feu'u and artist friends. This group shared a goal of mutual support for the promotion of Pacific visual art artists, at a time when Pacific art was in the very early stages of recognition as a particular genre. In 2005, Tautai celebrated its 10th anniversary as a formalised organisation. Members include other established Pacific artists such as painter and sculptor Johnny Penisula, multi-media artist Shigeyuki Kihara and Michel Tuffery. By 2022 the Tautai Pacific Arts Trust is considered a leading Pacific arts organisation, the director is Courtney Sina Meredith, and the premises are on Karangahape Road in Auckland.

New Zealand Arts Icon Award
In December 2022 Feu'u was a recipient of the New Zealand Arts Icon Award Whakamana Hiranga, which makes him one of twenty current living cultural icons.

References

External links
 Works by Fatu Feu'u in the collection of the Museum of New Zealand Te Papa Tongarewa

1946 births
Samoan painters
New Zealand painters
Living people
Honorary Officers of the New Zealand Order of Merit
People from Atua (district)